Düdəngə (also, Dudangya and Dyudengya) is a village and municipality in the Sharur District of Nakhchivan Autonomous Republic, Azerbaijan. It is located next to the district center. Its population is mainly busy with farming and animal husbandry. There are secondary school, club and a medical center in the village. It has a population of 4,012.

Etymology
The name of the Dudəngə village was made out from the Iranian origin words of dü (two) and dəngə (block, part of the city) means "village with two blocks".

References 

Populated places in Sharur District